Casasia is a genus of flowering plants in the family Rubiaceae. These shrubs or small trees occur on the Caribbean islands and in one case (Seven-year Apple, C. clusiifolia) in Florida. Some of the ten accepted species were formerly placed elsewhere, e.g. in the related genip-tree genus (Genipa), in Gardenia or in Randia.

Species
 Casasia acunae M.Fernández Zeq. & A.Borhidi - Cuba
 Casasia calophylla A.Rich. - Cuba
 Casasia clusiifolia (Jacq.) Urb. - Seven-year Apple
 Casasia clusiifolia var. clusiifolia - Florida, Bermuda, Bahamas, Cuba, Turks & Caicos Islands
 Casasia clusiifolia var. hirsuta Borhidi - Cuba
 Casasia domingensis (DC.) Urb. - Dominican Republic
 Casasia ekmanii Urb. - Haiti
 Casasia haitensis Urb. & Ekman - Haiti
 Casasia jacquinioides (Griseb.) Standl. - Cuba
 Casasia longipes Urb. - Jamaica
 Casasia nigrescens (Griseb.) C.Wright ex Rob.
 Casasia nigrescens subsp. moaensis Borhidi & O.Muñiz - Cuba
 Casasia nigrescens subsp. nigrescens - Cuba
 Casasia samuelssonii Urb. & Ekman - Dominican Republic

References

External links
Casasia in the World Checklist of Rubiaceae
Regional Conservation Center, Floristic Inventory for South Florida Database

 
Rubiaceae genera
Flora of the Caribbean
Taxonomy articles created by Polbot